Pulsze  is a village in the administrative district of Gmina Wyszki, within Bielsk County, Podlaskie Voivodeship, in north-eastern Poland.

According to the 1921 census, the village was inhabited by 434 people, among whom 398 were Roman Catholic, 6 Orthodox, and 30 Mosaic. At the same time, 406 inhabitants declared Polish nationality, 1 Belarusian and 27 Jewish. There were 77 residential buildings in the village.

References

Pulsze